Joffroy is a surname. Notable people with the surname include:

Alix Joffroy (1844–1908), French neurologist and psychiatrist remembered for describing Joffroy's sign
Pierre Joffroy (born 1929), French author, dramaturge and journalist who writes for Paris Match, Libération and L'Express

See also
Joffroy's sign, clinical sign in which there is a lack of wrinkling of the forehead when a patient looks up with the head bent forwards